Liberia made its Paralympic Games debut at the 2012 Summer Paralympics in London, sending one representative to compete in powerlifting.

See also
Liberia at the Olympics

External links
International Paralympic Committee/Liberia

References